This is the discography of American rapper Raekwon.

Albums

Studio albums

Collaboration albums

Mixtapes

Compilation albums

Extended plays

Singles

As lead artist

As featured artist

Guest appearances

Music videos

Notes

References 

Hip hop discographies
Discographies of American artists